Garden City station may refer to:

Garden City bus station, a TransLink bus station in Upper Mount Gravatt, Queensland, Australia
Garden City station (Kansas), an Amtrak station in Garden City, Kansas, USA
Garden City (LIRR station), a Long Island Rail Road station in Garden City, New York, USA
Merillon Avenue (LIRR station), formerly Garden City station, a Long Island Rail Road station in Garden City, New York, USA

See also
Garden City (disambiguation)